Barred Bay is a natural bay near St. John Harbor, off the island of Newfoundland in the province of Newfoundland and Labrador, Canada.

References

Bays of Newfoundland and Labrador